Neosho County (standard abbreviation: NO) is a county located in Southeast Kansas. As of the 2020 census, the county population was 15,904. The county seat is Erie.

History

Early history

For many millennia, the Great Plains of North America was inhabited by nomadic Native Americans.  From the 16th century to 18th century, the Kingdom of France claimed ownership of large parts of North America.  In 1762, after the French and Indian War, France secretly ceded New France to Spain, per the Treaty of Fontainebleau.

19th century
In 1802, Spain returned most of the land to France, but keeping title to about 7,500 square miles.  In 1803, most of the land for modern day Kansas was acquired by the United States from France as part of the 828,000 square mile Louisiana Purchase for 2.83 cents per acre.

In 1854, the Kansas Territory was organized, then in 1861 Kansas became the 34th U.S. state.  In 1861, Neosho County was established.

The first railroad was built through Neosho County in 1870.

Geography

Adjacent counties
 Allen County (north)
 Bourbon County (northeast)
 Crawford County (east)
 Labette County (south)
 Montgomery County (southwest)
 Wilson County (west)
 Woodson County (northwest)

Demographics

As of the census of 2000, there were 16,997 people, 6,739 households, and 4,683 families residing in the county.  The population density was 30 people per square mile (11/km2).  There were 7,461 housing units at an average density of 13 per square mile (5/km2).  The racial makeup of the county was 94.90% White, 0.87% Black or African American, 0.98% Native American, 0.32% Asian, 0.02% Pacific Islander, 1.05% from other races, and 1.86% from two or more races.  2.91% of the population were Hispanic or Latino of any race.

There were 6,739 households, out of which 31.50% had children under the age of 18 living with them, 57.40% were married couples living together, 8.50% had a female householder with no husband present, and 30.50% were non-families. 27.10% of all households were made up of individuals, and 13.80% had someone living alone who was 65 years of age or older.  The average household size was 2.45 and the average family size was 2.96.

In the county, the population was spread out, with 25.70% under the age of 18, 8.90% from 18 to 24, 25.40% from 25 to 44, 22.50% from 45 to 64, and 17.50% who were 65 years of age or older.  The median age was 38 years. For every 100 females there were 93.40 males.  For every 100 females age 18 and over, there were 91.10 males.

The median income for a household in the county was $32,167, and the median income for a family was $38,532. Males had a median income of $26,906 versus $19,387 for females. The per capita income for the county was $16,539.  About 10.00% of families and 13.00% of the population were below the poverty line, including 17.60% of those under age 18 and 10.60% of those age 65 or over.

Government

Presidential elections
Neosho County is a mostly Republican county. Only six presidential elections from 1888 to the present have resulted in Republicans failing to win the county, with the last of these being in 1964. However, like the rest of the four most southeasterly Kansas counties, Democrats have maintained a sizable presence, but not enough to win the county.

Laws
Following amendment to the Kansas Constitution in 1986, the county remained a prohibition, or "dry", county until 1998, when voters approved the sale of alcoholic liquor by the individual drink with a 30 percent food sales requirement.

Education

Unified school districts
 Erie-Galesburg USD 101, serves the communities of Erie, Galesburg, Stark.
 Southeast USD 247, serves primarily portions of Crawford and Cherokee counties, but also includes small portions of Labette and Neosho counties.
 Chanute USD 413
 Chetopa–St. Paul USD 505
 Cherryvale-Thayer USD 447

Communities

Cities
 Chanute
 Earlton
 Erie
 Galesburg
 Stark
 St. Paul
 Thayer

Unincorporated communities
 Kimball
 Leanna (on Allen County line)
 Morehead
 Odense
 Rollin
 Shaw
 South Mound
 Urbana

Townships
Neosho County is divided into twelve townships.  The city of Chanute is considered governmentally independent and is excluded from the census figures for the townships.  In the following table, the population center is the largest city (or cities) included in that township's population total, if it is of a significant size.

See also
National Register of Historic Places listings in Neosho County, Kansas

References

Further reading

 Standard Atlas of Neosho County, Kansas; Geo. A. Ogle & Co; 53 pages; 1906.

External links

County
 
 Neosho County - Directory of Public Officials
Maps
 Neosho County Maps: Current, Historic, KDOT
 Kansas Highway Maps: Current, Historic, KDOT
 Kansas Railroad Maps: Current, 1996, 1915, KDOT and Kansas Historical Society

 
Kansas counties
Kansas placenames of Native American origin
1861 establishments in Kansas
Populated places established in 1861